Jean-Paul Samputu (born 15 March 1962) is a singer, songwriter, and musician from Rwanda. 
Jean Paul Samputu has established himself as one of the most prominent African artists on the world stage.  A winner of the prestigious Kora Award (the "African Grammy") in 2003, Samputu travels the world as a cultural ambassador for Rwanda, bringing to his audiences not only traditional African singing, dancing, and drumming, but also a message of peace and reconciliation. A survivor of the genocide in Rwanda, Samputu takes us to the most positive place of humanity through his spirit and graciousness. More than a talented and inspiring musician, Samputu is a model for anyone who wants to make a difference in this world today.

Born in Rwanda in 1962, Samputu began singing in 1977 in a church choir, and was influenced by traditional and contemporary music, including Stevie Wonder, Bob Marley, Jimmy Cliff, and Lionel Richie. After winning the Kora Award for Best African Traditional Artist in 2003, he arrived in the US in 2004 for Ten Years Remembering, an event commemorating the 10th anniversary of the genocide in Rwanda. He continues his efforts to educate young people about genocide through panel discussions and forums at colleges and universities across the country. Samputu has been honored with the opportunity to share his message and his music at The National Civil Rights Museum for the 2005 Freedom Awards, where he performed in front of honorees Oprah Winfrey, and Ruby Dee, as well as the ceremony's host, Golden Globe Award winner Angela Bassett. He is one of only two African artists to perform for the World Culture Open at the Lincoln Center in New York, and has also performed for the UN High Commissioner for Refugees for World Refugees Day. Other performances include Duke University, as part of Duke's prestigious Performance Series, the Lake Eden Arts Festival (LEAF) in North Carolina, Pace University and Pace Law School, and many other universities, churches, schools, and communities.

His CD, Abana, showcases Samputu's versatility. His recordings are steeped in the many rich traditions of Rwandan music and dance, and include influences from Uganda, Burundi, and the Congo, as well as pygmy voices and traditions. It is this deep and fertile mix of songs, instruments, and dances that embodies Samputu's tremendously varied talents. Samputu sings in 6 languages (Kinyarwanda, Swahili, Lingala, Ganda, French and English), and in styles ranging from soukous, rhumba and reggae, to traditional Rwandan 5/8, Afrobeat, pygmy, and gospel. He combines unique musical traditions from all regions of Rwanda, among them, Intwatwa, Umushayayo, Imparamba, and Ikinimba. His dance technique and style demonstrates why UNESCO officially declared Rwandan national dance one of the world's Unique Cultural Heritages. With his dance troupe Ingeli, he captivates audiences of all ages. He has performed for the UN High Commissioner for Refugees, at the National Museum of Civil Rights Freedom Awards, and at many colleges, universities, festivals, churches, and communities around the world.
In the 1980s, Samputu was a member of popular Rwandan band Nyampinga, who produced three albums. In 1985 he produced his first solo LP, Tegeka Isi. Throughout the late 1986 he was a band leader of Orchestra INGELI. Samputu toured Europe in 1993, and released his Twararutashye LP.  During the Rwandan genocide in 1994, he lost his parents and three siblings. In 1998 he moved to Canada, and in 2004 moved to the United States. Currently, he now resides in Brighton's area in United Kingdom.

Samputu performs songs in six languages; Kinyarwanda, Swahili, Lingala, Luganda, French, and English, and in various musical styles such as soukous, rumba, reggae, afrobeat and gospel.

Jean Paul Samputu was signed to Mi5 Recordings and distributed by EMI. He worked with Producer and former Modern English member Ted Mason as well as Sandra Bernhard's new Afropop/rock project. Collaborating on the project are Chrissie Hynde, Papa Wemba, Lagbaja, et al. Samputu joined Sandra Bernhard and guest artists for a tour in 2008. Jean Paul has been managed by Keith Douglas and Andrea Wilson at RKD Music Management and Corinne Hugenin at GenialAgi (2017-2020).

Early life 
Jean Paul Samputu was born on 15 March 1962 in Butare, Rwanda.

Awards and honours
Kora Award for Most Promising African Male Artist, 2003
2006 International Songwriting Competition: 1st-place winner for World Music for "Psalm 150"
Inter Religious and International Federation for World Peace: Ambassador of Peace, 2007

Discography

Albums

Singles
 Suzuki (1983 with Nyampinga 
Band)
Nyaruguru
 Ingendo Y'Abeza (1984 with Nyampinga Band)
 Mr. Bigirumwami (1986 with Ingeli Band)
 Rwanda Rwiza (1987)
 Twararutashye (1993 with Ingeli Band)
 Kenyera Inkindi Y'Ubuzima (1995)
 Mutima W'Urugo (1996)
 Ubaha Ikiremwa Muntu (1997)
 Ubuphura Buba Munda (1997)
 Igihe Kirageze (1999)
 Disi Garuka (2000)

References

External links
 http://www.samputumusic.com
 http://www.samputufc.org
 http://www.mizero.org
 Voices from Rwanda (2006)
 Frank Bessem's Musiques d'Afrique:
 1st PLACE WINNER  for WORLD MUSIC in the INTERNATIONAL SONGWRITING COMPETITION
Samputu Interview

Rwandan male singers
1962 births
Living people
Rwandan emigrants to Canada